Burton W. Silcock (July 29, 1922 – January 4, 2008) was an American administrator who served as the Director of the Bureau of Land Management from 1971 to 1973.

Silcock revived numerous awards for his work including the Interior Secretary’s Excellence of Service Award, the Presidential Management Improvement Award and American Motor’s Conservation Award. Utah State University gave him their Distinguished Service Award in 1984 and a Lifetime Achievement Award in 2000.

He died on January 4, 2008, in Meridian, Idaho at age 85.

References

1922 births
2008 deaths
Bureau of Land Management personnel
Idaho Republicans